Francis Kama Massampu (born 26 December 1991) is a French professional footballer who plays for FC Mantes as a forward.

Club career
He began his career with US Boulogne playing on the club's under-17 team. In 2009, Massampu joined Championnat de France amateur club FC Mantes initially playing on the club's under-19 team. On 9 August 2009, he made his debut for the club in a league match against the reserve team of Auxerre. Massampu finished the campaign with 13 appearances and two goals. In May 2010, he signed with professional club Valenciennes FC and spent the first two months of his career at the club on the club's its reserve team. On 21 September 2010, Massampu made his professional debut in a Coupe de la Ligue match against Nîmes Olympique appearing as a substitute. Valenciennes won the match 5–4 on penalties.

He trained with the reserves of Deportivo de La Coruña, waiting for the opening of the winter transfer window to sign for them.

References

External links
 

1991 births
French footballers
French sportspeople of Democratic Republic of the Congo descent
Ligue 1 players
Valenciennes FC players
Tercera División players
Living people
FC Mantois 78 players
Aviron Bayonnais FC players
People from Mantes-la-Jolie
Deportivo Fabril players
Association football forwards
Footballers from Yvelines
Black French sportspeople